Ravi Jaipuria is an Indian billionaire businessman and chairman of RJ Corp. Under RJ Corp, he manages Devyani International, which is India's largest franchisee of Yum! Brands and operates KFC, Pizza Hut, Costa Coffee and TWG Tea outlets. The other listed company under RJ Corp, Varun Beverages is the second-largest bottling partner for PepsiCo's soft drink brands outside the US. He is referred to as India's cola king.

Career
Jaipuria studied business management in the United States and returned to India in 1985. He joined the family business as a bottler for Pepsi-Cola.  He also holds a minority stake in Medanta, a health care firm.

Varun Beverages got listed on BSE and NSE after an initial public offering in 2016. Devyani International got listed on the BSE and NSE after its IPO in 2021.

As of August 2022, Jaipuria has an estimated net worth of approximately $7.5 billion as ranked by Forbes.

Personal life 
His wife died in a plane crash in 1985. He has two children, one son named Varun and a daughter named Devyani. He hails from a Marwari family.

Recognition 
 Ravi Jaipuria was awarded the Bottler of the Year by PepsiCo in 1999. He received the award from former US President George H. W. Bush.
 According to Forbes, Ravi Jaipuria ranked #83 in Forbes's India Rich List in 2016.
 He was placed #73 in Forbes's India Rich List in 2015, #60 in Forbes's India Rich List 2014 and #47 in Forbes's India Rich List 2013.

References 

Living people
Businesspeople from Delhi
Indian billionaires
Indian chairpersons of corporations
Year of birth missing (living people)
Businesspeople from Jaipur